The 2011 World Archery Championships was the 46th edition of the event. It was held in Turin, Italy on 2–10 July 2011 and was organized by International Archery Federation (FITA). The event was contested in two different areas. The preliminary rounds were held at the Palazzina di caccia of Stupinigi in Nichelino (10km south-west of Turin) and the finals were held at the Piazza Castello in Turin.

The top eight teams in the recurve competition for men and women qualified for the 2012 Summer Olympics, as eight athletes from NOC's not already qualified qualified quotas for their countries.

Medals table

Medals summary

Recurve

Compound

Participating nations
At the close of preliminary registrations, 87 nations registered a record number of athletes.

  (2)
  (5)
  (7)
  (6)
  (3)
  (9)
  (9)
  (6)
  (9)
  (4)
  (12)
  (5)
  (6)
  (3)
  (11)
  (5)
  (3)
  (6)
  (9)
  (10)
  (1)
  (10)
  (6)
  (6)
  (12)
  (12)
  (12)
  (6)
  (12)
  (10)
  (7)
  (1)
  (8)
  (12)
  (12)
  (12)
  (6)
  (11)
  (3)
  (12)
  (8)
  (8)
  (2)
  (7)
  (8)
  (6)
  (6)
  (6)
  (12)
  (4)
  (7)
  (1)
  (6)
  (4)
  (3)
  (12)
  (8)
  (8)
  (6)
  (7)
  (3)
  (6)
  (6)
  (7)
  (9)
  (12)
  (6)
  (4)
  (6)
  (11)
  (12)
  (7)
  (11)
  (12)
  (12)
  (6)
  (12)
  (8)
  (4)
  (8)
  (10)
  (6)
  (6)
  (12)
  (12)
  (12)

References

External links
 Official website

 
World Championship
World Archery
Archery
World Archery Championships